The name Eurymachus (Ancient Greek: Εὐρύμαχος Eurúmakhos) is attributed to the following individuals:

Mythology

 Eurymachus, son of Hermes and father of Eriboea, mother of the Aloadae.
Eurymachus, a prince of the Phlegyes who attacked and destroyed Thebes after the death of Amphion and Zethus.
Eurymachus, the fourth suitor of Princess Hippodamia of Pisa, Elis. Like the other suitors of the latter, he was killed by the bride's father, King Oenomaus.
 Eurymachus, son of Antenor and Theano. He was the brother of Crino, Acamas, Agenor, Antheus, Archelochus, Coön, Demoleon, Glaucus, Helicaon, Iphidamas, Laodamas, Laodocus, Medon, Polybus,  and Thersilochus. Eurymachus was engaged to King Priam's daughter Polyxena.
 Eurymachus, a fisherman from Syme, a small island between Caria and Rhodes, who came with their leader Nireus to fight against Troy. He was killed with a spear by Polydamas, the Trojan friend of Hector.
 Eurymachus, an Achaean warrior who participated in the Trojan War. He was among those who hid inside the Wooden Horse.
Eurymachus, son of Polybus and one of the suitors of Penelope.

History
Eurymachus, one of the 180 Theban soldiers who were taken prisoner in the Theban siege of Plataea.  All of the Theban soldiers were killed after the Plataeans brought everyone living outside of their walls into the city after unrequited negotiation with Thebes's nightly backup troops. Thucydides states that Eurymachus was "a man of great influence at Thebes," and that the Platean, Naucleides, arranged with him to bring in "a little over 300" Theban troops in the middle of the night, for a sneak attack.  This event touched off the Peloponnesian War.

Notes

References

 Apollodorus, The Library with an English Translation by Sir James George Frazer, F.B.A., F.R.S. in 2 Volumes, Cambridge, MA, Harvard University Press; London, William Heinemann Ltd. 1921. ISBN 0-674-99135-4. Online version at the Perseus Digital Library. Greek text available from the same website.
 Dictys Cretensis, from The Trojan War. The Chronicles of Dictys of Crete and Dares the Phrygian translated by Richard McIlwaine Frazer, Jr. (1931-). Indiana University Press. 1966. Online version at the Topos Text Project.
 Homer, The Iliad with an English Translation by A.T. Murray, Ph.D. in two volumes. Cambridge, MA., Harvard University Press; London, William Heinemann, Ltd. 1924. . Online version at the Perseus Digital Library.
 Homer, Homeri Opera in five volumes. Oxford, Oxford University Press. 1920. . Greek text available at the Perseus Digital Library.
 Homer, The Odyssey with an English Translation by A.T. Murray, Ph.D. in two volumes. Cambridge, MA., Harvard University Press; London, William Heinemann, Ltd. 1919. . Online version at the Perseus Digital Library. Greek text available from the same website.
 Homer. Odyssey. Trans. Stanley Lombardo. Canada: Hackett Publishing Company, Inc., 2000. Print.
 Pausanias, Description of Greece with an English Translation by W.H.S. Jones, Litt.D., and H.A. Ormerod, M.A., in 4 Volumes. Cambridge, MA, Harvard University Press; London, William Heinemann Ltd. 1918. . Online version at the Perseus Digital Library
 Pausanias, Graeciae Descriptio. 3 vols. Leipzig, Teubner. 1903.  Greek text available at the Perseus Digital Library.
 Publius Vergilius Maro, Aeneid. Theodore C. Williams. trans. Boston. Houghton Mifflin Co. 1910. Online version at the Perseus Digital Library.
 Publius Vergilius Maro, Bucolics, Aeneid, and Georgics. J. B. Greenough. Boston. Ginn & Co. 1900. Latin text available at the Perseus Digital Library.
 Quintus Smyrnaeus, The Fall of Troy translated by Way. A. S. Loeb Classical Library Volume 19. London: William Heinemann, 1913. Online version at theio.com
Quintus Smyrnaeus, The Fall of Troy. Arthur S. Way. London: William Heinemann; New York: G.P. Putnam's Sons. 1913. Greek text available at the Perseus Digital Library.
 Smith, William. (1870). Dictionary of Greek and Roman Biography and Mythology. London: Taylor, Walton, and Maberly.
Thucydides. History of the Peloponnesian War, Book II.
 Tzetzes, John, Allegories of the Iliad translated by Goldwyn, Adam J. and Kokkini, Dimitra. Dumbarton Oaks Medieval Library, Harvard University Press, 2015.

Achaeans (Homer)
Trojans
People of the Trojan War
Characters in the Odyssey
Boeotian mythology
Thessalian characters in Greek mythology
Ancient Greeks